Centranthus macrosiphon, also commonly called long-spurred valerian, is a herb of the family Caprifoliaceae.

It blooms in spring and early summer producing pink-red-white flowers.

The species is native to Northern Africa and southwestern Europe but has become naturalised in many areas including the south west of Western Australia.

References

macrosiphon
Flora of Spain
Flora of Morocco
Flora of Algeria